This page lists the World Best Year Performance in the year 2002 in both the men's and the women's shot put. One of the main event during this season were the 2002 European Athletics Championships in Munich, Germany, where the final of the men's competition was held on Tuesday August 6, 2002. The women had their final four days later, on Saturday August 10, 2002.

Men

Records

2002 World Year Ranking

Women

Records

2002 World Year Ranking

References
IAAF
tilastopaja
apulanta
apulanta

Shot Put Year Ranking, 2002
2002